Mario Romero (February 15, 1943 – June 28, 1998) was an Argentine poet, playwright and translator.

Works

Poetry
Signals. Editorial Monopole, Tucumán, 1973.
Painting blind. Editorial Stations, Madrid, 1982.
The other launches. Editorial Siesta, Stockholm, 1983.
The last cheek. Editorial mainland, Buenos Aires, 1988.
Red ink on black ink. Editorial Orions, Stockholm, 1997.
Old wall. Florida Blanca, Buenos Aires, 1998.

20th-century Argentine poets
20th-century Argentine male writers
Argentine male poets
1943 births
1998 deaths